Kaashidhoo (Dhivehi: ކާށިދޫ) is one of the inhabited islands of Kaafu Atoll.

History
Kashidhoo archaeological site is one of the most historically significant on the island. It is the largest pre-Islamic remnant uncovered on Kaashidhoo; excavations have uncovered parts of a Buddhist Monastery that existed in the 7th and 8th Centuries AD. The project focuses on conserving the area that has already been excavated, helping to protect the site from erosion and weathering. Since the site is built almost entirely of coral stone, the conservation work is essential to making sure that generations of Maldivians can continue to view this important site, US Embassy statement expressed.

Geography

Kaashidhoo is included in the Malé Atoll. However, it is an atoll by itself geographically. For the ease of administration, the island is placed under Kaafu Atoll.

Kaashidhoo Kandu
The Kaashidu Kandu, also known as Kardiva Channel, is the broad channel separating some of the central atolls of Maldives.

Demography

See also
Kaashidhoo Bodu Kandu
Kaashidhoo Kuda Kandu
Kuruhinna Tharaagandu

References

 Divehi Tārīkhah Au Alikameh. Divehi Bahāi Tārikhah Khidmaiykurā Qaumī Markazu. Reprint 1958 edn. Malé 1990. 
 Divehiraajjege Jōgrafīge Vanavaru. Muhammadu Ibrahim Lutfee. G.Sōsanī.
 Xavier Romero-Frias, The Maldive Islanders, A Study of the Popular Culture of an Ancient Ocean Kingdom. Barcelona 1999.

Islands of the Maldives